The golden-crowned babbler (Sterrhoptilus dennistouni) is a species of bird in the family Zosteropidae. It is endemic to the Philippines only being found in the moist tropical forest in Northern Luzon. It is threatened by habitat loss.

Description 
Ebird describes this as "A fairly small bird... Has a gray back and cheek with fine pale streaks, dark wings and tail with white outer tail feathers, white underparts, and a yellow throat and crown. Note the slender black bill. Gives soft 'whip' calls while feeding." They are spotted foraging alone, in pairs or in mixed flocks with other species.   

The golden-crowned babbler has been known to interbreed with the Calabarzon babbler in areas where their range overlaps.

Habitat and Conservation Status 
Its natural habitat is tropical moist lowland forest
up to 1,150 m. It is often seen in   lowland and foothill forest, open wooded areas with developed understory, bamboo, and tall grass. The IUCN Redlist has classified this species as near threatened. Its threats are mainly habitat loss due to deforestation for lumber, mining and farmlands.  There are no known targeted conservation actions for this bird but it will indirectly benefit from the conservation of other North Luzon species like the Critically Endangered Isabela oriole. The stronghold of the Isabela oriole in Baggao is being proposed as a protected area and will thus preserve key habitat for this beautiful babbler.

References

Collar, N. J. & Robson, C. 2007. Family Timaliidae (Babblers)  pp. 70 – 291 in; del Hoyo, J., Elliott, A. & Christie, D.A. eds. Handbook of the Birds of the World, Vol. 12. Picathartes to Tits and Chickadees. Lynx Edicions, Barcelona.

Sterrhoptilus
Birds of Luzon
Birds described in 1895
Taxonomy articles created by Polbot